Jalan Bukit Chabang is a major road to Wang Kelian, Perlis. It connects from Malaysia Federal Route 7 to Malaysia Federal Route 265. This road used to have one more section. The second section is a deleted state road. The road has not been used since 1994 and disappeared in 1996 because of the flood by Timah Tasoh Lake.

Roads in Perlis